Howard Lovewell Cheney  (1889–1969) was an architect and engineer. He designed Washington National Airport and the Miami Beach Post Office (1937). He was a fellow with the American Institute of Architects.

Life and career
Cheney was born in Chicago, Illinois in 1889. He studied at the Armour Institute of Technology and the University of Illinois. He worked for the Public Buildings Branch of the U.S. Treasury Department from 1934 to 1942; and for the University of Illinois from 1938 to 1940 and again from 1946 to 1948. 

He designed the Federal Building (Gary, Indiana) as well as Federal Buildings in Peoria, Illinois and New Orleans. He designed the Federal Building and Court of Peace for the 1939 World's Fair. He designed the First Church of Christ, Scientist at 2410 Fairfield Ave in Fort Wayne Indiana, which was built in 1927, and later converted into the Karpeles Manuscript Library Museum.  He designed the original Washington National Airport building and was supervising architect for the construction of the Chicago Tribune Tower in Chicago. He also designed the Palladium at St. Petersburg College.

Works
F. Edward Hebert Federal Building (1939) on Camp Street in New Orleans. Art Deco architecture 
C.A. Johnson Residence in Highland Park, Illinois
 Federal Building at the New York World's Fair   
 Sixteenth Church of Christ, Scientist – a contributing property to the North Shore Historic District in St. Petersburg, Florida
 Unidentified residence with Bernard C. Greengard in Evanston, Illinois
 West Town State Bank in Chicago, Illinois
Washington National Airport (1940)
Miami Beach Post Office at 13th Street, north-west corner (1938–39)
Federal Building and U.S. Courthouse (Peoria, Illinois) (1938), a limestone and granite building in Art Deco architecture / Art Nouveau architecture / Art Moderne architecture. Three stories and 118,000 square-feet. Bas reliefs by Freeman L. Schoolcraft
Stockyards Post Office on Halsted in Canaryville, Chicago
U.S. Post Office (Gary, Indiana) (constructed 1936 and abandoned 1970s)

References

Further reading
Howard Lovewell Cheney

See also  
 Charles M. Goodman

1889 births
1969 deaths
Architects from Chicago
Illinois Institute of Technology alumni
University of Illinois Urbana-Champaign alumni
20th-century American architects
Fellows of the American Institute of Architects